Patrick Murray (13 March 1874 – 1925) was a Scottish footballer who played in the Football League for Darwen, Nottingham Forest  and Preston North End.

References

1874 births
1925 deaths
Scottish footballers
Footballers from Edinburgh
Scottish Junior Football Association players
Scottish Football League players
English Football League players
Association football forwards
Royal Albert F.C. players
Hibernian F.C. players
Darwen F.C. players
East Stirlingshire F.C. players
Preston North End F.C. players
Wishaw Thistle F.C. players
Nottingham Forest F.C. players
Celtic F.C. players
Arthurlie F.C. players
Portsmouth F.C. players